Gethsemani may refer to:
 Gethsemane, a garden in Jerusalem believed to be the place where Jesus and his disciples prayed the night before the crucifixion
 Abbey of Our Lady of Gethsemani, Bardstown, Kentucky, U.S.
 Getsemaní, a district in the old town of Cartagena, Colombia; see Puerta del Reloj, Cartagena
 Gethsémani, a former name of La Romaine, Quebec, Canada

See also
 Gethsemane  (disambiguation)